Crataegus chlorosarca is an Asian species of hawthorn with black fruit. Although recommended as an ornamental and hardy in cold climates, it is rarely cultivated.

See also
 List of hawthorn species with black fruit

References

chlorosarca
Flora of Asia